Seling may refer to:

People
 John W. Seling (died 1986), American politician
 Paula Seling (born 1978), Romanian singer

Places
 Seling, town in India

Other uses
 Seling v. Young, American court case

See also
 Josef Antonín Sehling (1710–1756), Bohemian composer and violonist